Capitol/Rice Street is a light rail station along the Metro Green Line in Saint Paul, Minnesota. It is located along the south side of University Avenue between Rice Street and Park Street/Rev. Dr. Martin Luther King Jr. Boulevard.  This is on the north side of Leif Erikson Park, west of the Minnesota State Capitol.

Construction in this area began in 2012.  The station opened along with the rest of the line in 2014.

References

External links
Metro Transit: Capitol/Rice Street Station

Metro Green Line (Minnesota) stations in Saint Paul, Minnesota
Railway stations in the United States opened in 2014
2014 establishments in Minnesota